Jeremiah Halsey Pierson (September 13, 1766 – December 12, 1855) was an American politician from New York.

Life
Pierson was born on September 13, 1766 in Newark, Province of New Jersey in what was then British America.  In 1772, Pierson and his parents moved to Richmond, Massachusetts. He attended the public schools in Richmond and Stockbridge, Massachusetts, and completed preparatory studies.

He was fifth in descent from Abraham Pierson, the first president of Yale University beginning in 1701.  The first American Pierson, Abraham Pierson the Elder, came to Boston in 1639 from Yorkshire, England and helped found Southampton, New York, Stamford, Connecticut, and Newark, New Jersey.

Career
He studied law, was admitted to the bar, and practiced in Massachusetts.

In 1795, Pierson moved to Ramapo.  He practiced law and engaged in mercantile pursuits and manufacturing. He was a Justice of the Peace from 1800 to 1811. He was an associate justice of the Rockland County Court in 1808.

Pierson was elected as a Democratic-Republican to the 17th United States Congress, holding office from December 3, 1821, to March 3, 1823. Afterwards he resumed his former business pursuits. He was largely instrumental in securing the construction of the Erie Railroad.

He was a delegate to the National Republican Convention at Baltimore in 1831.

Personal life
Pierson was married to Sarah (née Colt) (1772–1820), the daughter of Jabez Colt and Sarah Elizabeth (née Mix) Colt. Together, they were the parents of:

 Elizabeth Pierson (1794–1833), who married author and educator Eleazar Lord (1788–1871).
 Josiah Gilbert Pierson (1797–1845)
 Jeremiah Halsey Pierson (1800–1851)
 Theodore Pierson (1803–1816)
 Henry Pierson (1807–1807), who died young.
 Henry Lewis Pierson (1807–1893)
 Benjamin Franklin Pierson (1811–1836)

Pierson died on December 12, 1855 in Ramapo, New York.  He was buried at the Ramapo Cemetery.

Descendants
Through his son Henry Lewis Pierson, he was the grandfather of John Frederick Pierson (1839–1932), a brevet Brigadier General during the U.S. Civil War and society leader in New York and Newport during the Gilded Age, and Helen Maria Pierson, who married William Gaston Hamilton (son of John Church Hamilton and grandson of first U.S. Treasury Secretary Alexander Hamilton), and was, herself, the grandmother of Helen Morgan Hamilton, Pierpont Morgan Hamilton, and Alexander Morgan Hamilton.

References

External links 
 
 

1766 births
1855 deaths
New York (state) state court judges
People from Ramapo, New York
People from Stockbridge, Massachusetts
New York (state) National Republicans
19th-century American politicians
Democratic-Republican Party members of the United States House of Representatives from New York (state)
People from Richmond, Massachusetts